Heretick may refer to:

 Steve Heretick (born 1960), American politician
 The Heretick, a British satirical magazine

See also
 Heretic (disambiguation)